The Hewland AE75 is a lightweight  aircraft engine that was manufactured in the mid-1980s by Hewland in Maidenhead, United Kingdom.  The engine, a two-stroke inverted inline triple of  displacement, is liquid-cooled and yields

Design and development

Th AE75 was developed from Hewland's own  twin-cylinder microlight engine. The engine was designed specifically for the ARV Super2, a lightweight two-seater shoulder wing aircraft. Lubrication is via 40:1 pre-mix two-stroke oil.

Each of the engine's three cylinders has its own carburetor, with an alternate air device to provide carburetor heat. Each cylinder has twin spark plugs, the sparks being provided by a dual ignition system using engine-triggered amplifiers and coils, rather than the more common aviation magneto. The ignition circuit redundancy is such that if one circuit should fail, all three cylinders will still run. Even if two circuits fail, the engine will still fire on two out of three cylinders.

The engine has a 2.7:1 Propeller Speed Reduction Unit (PSRU) with helical gears in an oil bath.  Final drive to the wooden  diameter 2-blade Hoffman propeller was via a rubber “doughnut” coupling. The  PSRU design sited the axis of the propeller below that of the crankshaft. This feature allowed a more pointed nose on the ARV, at the cost of slightly reduced propeller clearance.

The Hewland AE75 was never fitted to any aircraft apart from the ARV Super2, and when ARV production ceased, Hewland stopped AE75 production also.  The rights to the AE75 were bought by MidWest, who were developing their AE100 twin-rotor Wankel aero-engine.  MidWest had intended to restart production of the AE75 near Stroud, Gloucestershire, but this never materialised. MidWest based the AE100's gearbox on the AE75's PSRU, amending it so that the propeller axis was above the eccentric shaft's axis.  This increased propeller clearance, but also raised the ARV's thrust line.

MidWest was bought by Diamond Aircraft Industries of Wiener Neustadt, Austria, but MidWest's rights to the Hewland AE75 engine were sold to a Manchester, UK private buyer. Also being addressed is one of the AE75's identified deficiencies, the water-pump belt drive which, should the belt break when airborne, can lead to overheating and piston seizure. Resumed production of this modified Hewland engine is uncertain.

The Hewland AE75 should not be confused with the  Austro Engine AE75R, a Wankel aero-engine developed from the MidWest AE50, a single-rotor version of the AE100.

Applications
 ARV Super2

Specifications

See also

References

1980s aircraft piston engines